Nosferatu is the eighth album by Art Zoyd, released in 1989 through Mantra Records. It is their first album to only be released on compact disc.

Track listing

Personnel 
Art Zoyd
Patricia Dallio – piano, keyboards
Gérard Hourbette – viola, violin, keyboards, percussion, tape, sampler
André Mergenthaler – cello, alto saxophone
Thierry Zaboitzeff – cello, bass guitar, vocals, keyboards, tape, sampler, percussion
Production and additional personnel
Art Zoyd – production, mastering, mixing, recording
Unsafe Graphics – design
Emmanuel Valette – photography
Fritz Arno Wagner – photography

References

External links 
 

1989 albums
Art Zoyd albums
Nosferatu